Enchanted Kingdom (abbreviated as EK), is a theme park in the Philippines. It is located in Santa Rosa, Laguna. The park is managed and operated by Enchanted Kingdom Inc.

Enchanted Kingdom is a member of the International Association of Amusement Parks and Attractions (IAAPA).

History

Foundation
The theme park was founded by Mario and Cynthia Mamon. Their family frequently visited local theme parks such as Boom na Boom, Big Bang sa Alabang, and Fiesta Carnival, all of which inspired the couple to open a theme park of their own. While they were visiting Ocean Park in Hong Kong in the early 1990s, they attended an amusement conference being held in the country where they were then introduced to the International Association of Amusement Parks and Attractions (IAAPA). Realizing the group can help them enter the amusement park industry, they joined the association in 1992 following their first trade show attendance in Dallas, Texas.

Aside from being the founder and President of Enchanted Kingdom, Mario Mamon is the first Asian and first Filipino to head the International Association of Amusement Parks and Attractions or IAAPA.

Construction
The IAAPA assisted the Mamons on getting consultants, contractors, and suppliers to set up Enchanted Kingdom. Gary Goddard, who was then with Landmark Entertainment, designed and planned the park while Cincinnati-based firm International Theme Park Services, Inc. consulted the Mamons regarding amusement parks, especially on topics such as safety and operations, for the first three years. Construction on the park began in August 1994 on a property covering . Construction was rushed to surpass other potential competitors seeking to establish their own amusement park in the Philippines, and the park opened on June 1995.

Operation

Operations of Enchanted Kingdom were with difficulties during its first years from 1995 to 2002, with the 1997 Asian financial crisis affecting the business significantly only recovering from the financial breakdown in 2003. When business stabilized, the management began introducing two entertainment units per year. Business grew and was later registered the highest daytime visit to an amusement part in Region IV (Calabarzon and Mimaropa regions) from the Department of Tourism. Domestic visitors comprise the majority of the amusement park's visitors.

In early 2020, the park's operations were halted due to the COVID-19 pandemic. Its operations has been resumed and halted multiple times due to the pandemic, last reopening on June 5, 2021. The amusement park's operations was suspended again from January 5 to February 24, 2022 due to the increase of Omicron cases.

Future expansion
In 2016, Enchanted Kingdom began a 10-year expansion which includes the redevelopment of the existing theme park and addition of new zones, a regional convention center, a water park and a lifestyle center.

Layout and design 

The initial design of the park, which was presented to the Mamons by the consultants they brought in, was heavily inspired by Philippine architecture. The concept was not chosen since the Mamons preferred a fantasy-oriented design. Mario Mamon stated that if the initial design was used instead, it would result in visitors seeing what they see "outside in their normal lives" which he remarks would "sort of break the magic".

The rides and attractions of the park are scattered across nine themed zones. The zones are Victoria Park, Portabello, Boulderville, Midway Boardwalk, Brooklyn Place, Spaceport, Jungle Outpost, Eldar's Village, and Cultural Village. Victoria Park, which includes the main entrance, is patterned after the Victorian era. Boulderville is a small ride area for children which is similar to the fictional town of Bedrock from The Flintstones. Midway Boardwalk is based on 1930s Coney Island and features the most rides. Jungle Outpost is based on the Amazon Jungle in South America. Spaceport is dedicated to the Space Age. Brooklyn Place is based on 1940s New York and the silent film era. Finally, Portabello is based on the Caribbean/West Indies. Eldar's Village is a child-centered area dedicated to the theme park's mascot Eldar the Wizard and twin princesses Victoria and Madeline. The Cultural Village focuses on the culture and heritage of the Philippines.

Attractions

The Enchanted Kingdom hosts 31 rides and attractions as of 2022. Among the attractions is the Space Shuttle, a roller coaster, and the Wheel of Fate, a  Ferris wheel with 36 gondolas (each with a 6-person capacity), and the Agila: The EKsperience, a flight motion simulator ride.

Visitors
Enchanted Kingdom experienced financial difficulties in 1997, 2007, and 2008 but since 2009, the park has received a steady increase in regards to its number of visitors. However, in 2013, the park experienced a drop in attendance due to bad weather conditions in the latter half of the year which included Typhoon Haiyan (Yolanda). In 2015, it was reported that 10 percent of the park's visitors were foreigners, mostly Chinese and Koreans. In the same year, 1.8 million people visited the park, registering its largest attendance in its 20-year history.

Branding

Enchanted Kingdom does not pay royalties to outside sources regarding its characters and attractions, instead coming up with their own characters and other intellectual property. According to company owner, Mario Mamon, the attractions and shows are produced with educational and Filipino values in mind and not solely for entertainment and amusement purposes.

Characters
The main mascot of the park is Eldar the Wizard, who is designed to embody "knowledge and integrity". He is characterized as a jolly, old wizard from the distant land of Marsynthea. Another character devised by Enchanted Kingdom is Princess Victoria.

Incidents
 October 18, 2006: Two workers fell from the roof of a  structure while repairing a lightning arrester in the afternoon. Both were rushed to the St. James Hospital, also in Santa Rosa, after sustaining injuries from the fall. One of the two workers later died at the hospital. The management of the amusement park clarified that the accident was "not ride-related." The park resumed operations a week later.
 December 12, 2007: A train of Space Shuttle was stalled on its Cobra Roll element at around 6:00 p.m. All 25 riders, mostly students on an educational tour, were safely rescued. After that, Space Shuttle was temporarily suspended for technical renovation.

References

External links

Enchanted Kingdom
Amusement parks in the Philippines
Landmarks in the Philippines
Buildings and structures in Santa Rosa, Laguna
1995 establishments in the Philippines
Tourist attractions in Laguna (province)
Entertainment companies established in 1995